Treaty of Paris may refer to one of many treaties signed in Paris, France:

Treaties

1200s and 1300s
 Treaty of Paris (1229), which ended the Albigensian Crusade
 Treaty of Paris (1259), between Henry III of England and Louis IX of France
 Treaty of Paris (1303), between King Philip IV of France and King Edward I of England
 Treaty of Paris (1320), peace between King Philip V of France and Robert III, Count of Flanders
 Treaty of Paris (1323), in which Count Louis of Flanders relinquished Flemish claims over Zeeland
 Treaty of Paris (1355), a land exchange between France and Savoy

1500s to 1700s
 Treaty of Paris (1515), planning the marriage of the 15-year old future King Charles I of Spain and 4-year old Renée of France
 Treaty of Paris (1623), between France, Savoy, and Venice against Spanish forces in Valtelline
 Treaty of Paris (1626), peace between King Louis XIII and the Huguenots of La Rochelle
 Treaty of Paris (1657), established a military alliance between France and England against Spain
 Treaty of Paris (1718), between Philip of Orléans, Regent of France, and Leopold, Duke of Lorraine
 Treaty of Paris (1761), established the third Bourbon Family Compact between France and Spain
 Treaty of Paris (1763), ended the Seven Years' War/French and Indian War
 Treaty of Paris (1783), ended the American Revolutionary War
 Treaty of Paris (1784), ended the Fourth Anglo-Dutch War
 Treaty of Paris (1796), ended the war between France and the Kingdom of Piedmont-Sardinia

1800s
 Treaty of Paris (August 1801), ended the war between France and Bavaria
 , the final peace treaty between Russia and Spain; see Treaty of Paris (8 October 1801)
 Treaty of Paris (8 October 1801), the final peace treaty between France and Russia
 Treaty of Paris (1802), ended the war between France and the Ottoman Empire
 , creating the Confederation of the Rhine
 Treaty of Paris (February 1810), between France and the Kingdom of Bavaria
 Treaty of Paris (1810), ended the war between France and Sweden
 Treaty of Paris (24 February 1812), established an alliance between France and Prussia against Russia
 Treaty of Paris (14 March 1812), established an alliance between France and Austria against Russia
 Treaty of Paris (1814), signed between France and the Sixth Coalition
 Treaty of Paris (1815), signed between France and the Seventh Coalition, following the defeat of Napoleon at Waterloo
 , part of the Congress of Vienna
 Treaty of Paris (1856), ended the Crimean War
 Treaty of Paris (1857), ended the Anglo-Persian War
 Paris Convention for the Protection of Industrial Property (1883), one of the first intellectual property treaties
 Treaty of Paris (1898), ended the Spanish–American War

1900s and 2000s
 Treaty of Paris (1900), ended all conflicting claims between France and Spain over Río Muni in Africa
 Treaty of Paris (1918), between France and Monaco adapting provisions of the Franco-Monegasque Treaty of 1861 in the context of the Monaco succession crisis of 1918
 Paris Convention of 1919, the first international convention to address the political difficulties and intricacies involved in international aerial navigation
 Treaty of Paris (1920), united Bessarabia and Romania
 Treaties of Paris that ended World War I (at the Paris Peace Conference (1919–1920)):
 Treaty of Saint-Germain-en-Laye (1919), with Austria
 Treaty of Neuilly-sur-Seine (1919), with Bulgaria
 Treaty of Versailles (1919), with Germany
 Treaty of Trianon (1920), with Hungary
 Treaty of Sèvres (1920), with the Ottoman Empire
 Paris Peace Treaties, 1947, formally established peace between the World War II Allies and Bulgaria, Hungary, Italy, Romania and Finland
 Treaty of Paris (1951), established the European Coal and Steel Community
 Bonn–Paris conventions (1952), putting an end to the Allied occupation of West Germany
 Treaty establishing the European Defence Community (1952), an unratified treaty
 Paris Convention on Third Party Liability in the Field of Nuclear Energy (1960), liability and compensation for damage caused by accidents occurring while producing nuclear energy
 Paris Peace Accords (1973), ended American involvement in the Vietnam War
 Paris Charter (1990), helped form the Organization for Security and Co-operation in Europe
 1991 Paris Peace Accords, marked the end of the Cambodian-Vietnamese War
 Dayton Agreement (1995, formally signed in Paris), ending the Bosnia War
 Paris Agreement (2015), an international agreement regarding global warming

Other uses
 Treaty of Paris (painting), 1783 painting by Benjamin West
 Treaty of Paris (band), pop-punk rock band from Chicago
 Treaty of Paris, the horse which won the 2013 Acomb Stakes

See also
 Paris Peace Conference (disambiguation), conferences held before the signing of some of the Paris peace treaties
 Peace of Paris (1783) in which Great Britain signed treaties with France, Spain and the Dutch Republic and the United States
 Treaty of Versailles (disambiguation), treaties signed at the Palace of Versailles, in Versailles, a suburb of Paris, formally ended World War I on the Western Front
 List of treaties, a list of all known agreements, pacts, peaces, and major contracts between states, armies, governments, and tribal groups.
 List of Paris meetings, agreements and declarations, for other articles with similar titles or topics